Cyclophora urcearia is a moth of the  family Geometridae. It is found from Mexico to Paraguay and on Jamaica and in Trinidad.

References

Moths described in 1858
Cyclophora (moth)
Moths of North America
Moths of South America